Homing pigeons have long played an important role in war. Due to their homing ability, speed, and altitude, they were often used as military messengers. Carrier pigeons of the Racing Homer breed were used to carry messages in World War I and World War II, and 32 such pigeons were presented with the Dickin Medal.

During World War I and World War II, carrier pigeons were used to transport messages back to their home coop behind the lines. When they landed, wires in the coop would sound a bell or buzzer and a soldier of the Signal Corps would know a message had arrived. The soldier would go to the coop, remove the message from the canister, and send it to its destination by telegraph, field phone, or personal messenger.

A carrier pigeon's job was dangerous. Nearby enemy soldiers often tried to shoot down pigeons, knowing that released birds were carrying important messages. Some of these pigeons became quite famous among the infantrymen for whom they worked. One pigeon, named "Spike", flew 52 missions without receiving a single wound. Another, named Cher Ami, lost his foot and one eye, but his message got through, saving a large group of surrounded American infantrymen.

History 
Before the advent of radio, carrier pigeons were frequently used on the battlefield as a means for a mobile force to communicate with a stationary headquarters. In the sixth century BC, Cyrus, king of Persia, used carrier pigeons to communicate with various parts of his empire. In Ancient Rome, Julius Caesar used pigeons to send messages to the territory of Gaul.

During the 19th-century (1870–71) Franco-Prussian War, besieged Parisians used carrier pigeons to transmit messages outside the city; in response, the besieging Prussian Army employed hawks to hunt the pigeons. The French military used balloons to transport homing pigeons past enemy lines. Microfilm images containing hundreds of messages allowed letters to be carried into Paris by pigeon from as far away as London. More than one million different messages traveled this way during the four-month siege. They were then discovered to be very useful, and carrier pigeons were well considered in military theory leading up to World War I.

World War I 

Homing pigeons were used extensively during World War I. In 1914, during the First Battle of the Marne, the French army advanced 72 pigeon lofts with the troops. The US Army Signal Corps used 600 pigeons in France alone.

One of their homing pigeons, a Blue Check cock named Cher Ami, was awarded the French "Croix de Guerre with Palm" for heroic service delivering 12 important messages during the Battle of Verdun. On his final mission in October 1918, he delivered a message despite having been shot through the breast or wing. The crucial message, found in the capsule hanging from a ligament of his shattered leg, saved 194 US soldiers of the 77th Infantry Division's "Lost Battalion".

United States Navy aviators maintained 12 pigeon stations in France with a total inventory of 1,508 pigeons when the war ended. Pigeons were carried in airplanes to rapidly return messages to these stations, and 829 birds flew in 10,995 wartime aircraft patrols. Airmen of the 230 patrols with messages entrusted to pigeons threw the message-carrying pigeon either up or down, depending on the type of aircraft, to keep the pigeon out of the propeller and away from airflow toward the aircraft wings and struts. Eleven of the thrown pigeons went missing in action, but the remaining 219 messages were delivered successfully.

Pigeons were considered an essential element of naval aviation communication when the first United States aircraft carrier  was commissioned on 20 March 1922, so the ship included a pigeon house on the stern. The pigeons were trained at the Norfolk Naval Shipyard while Langley was undergoing conversion. As long as the pigeons were released a few at a time for exercise, they returned to the ship; but when the whole flock was released while Langley was anchored off Tangier Island, the pigeons flew south and roosted in the cranes of the Norfolk shipyard. The pigeons never went to sea again.

World War II and later deployments  
During World War II, the United Kingdom used about 250,000 homing pigeons for many purposes, including communicating with those behind enemy lines such as Belgian spy Jozef Raskin. The Dickin Medal, the highest possible decoration for valor given to animals, was awarded to 32 pigeons, including the United States Army Pigeon Service's G.I. Joe and the Irish pigeon Paddy.

The UK maintained the Air Ministry Pigeon Section during World War II and for a while thereafter. A Pigeon Policy Committee made decisions about the uses of pigeons in military contexts.  The head of the section, Lea Rayner, reported in 1945 that pigeons could be trained to deliver small explosives or bioweapons to precise targets. The ideas were not taken up by the committee, and in 1948 the UK military stated that pigeons were of no further use. During the war, messenger pigeons could draw a special allowance of corn and seed, but as soon as the war ended this had been cancelled and anyone keeping pigeons would have to draw on their own personal rationed corn and seed to also feed the pigeons. However, the UK security service MI5 was still concerned about the use of pigeons by enemy forces.  Until 1950, they arranged for 100 birds to be maintained by a civilian pigeon fancier in order to prepare for any eventuality. The Swiss army disbanded its Pigeon section in 1996.

21st century 
In 2010, Indian police expressed suspicion that a recently captured pigeon from Pakistan might have been carrying a message from Pakistan. In 2015, a pigeon from Pakistan was logged into Indian records as a "suspected spy". In May 2020, another suspected Pakistani spy pigeon was captured by Indian security forces in Jammu and Kashmir. After finding nothing suspicious, India authorities released the pigeon back into Pakistan.

In 2016, a Jordanian border official said at a news conference that Islamic State militants were using homing pigeons to deliver messages to operatives outside of  its "so-called caliphate".

Decorated war pigeons 
In total, 32 pigeons were decorated with the Dickin Medal including:
  "Winkie"  (1943)
 "Commando" (1944)
 "Paddy" (1944)
 "William of Orange" (1944)
 Mary of Exeter (1945)
 "G.I. Joe" (1946)
 Gustav (1944)
 Beach Comber (1944)

See also 
Pigeon post
Olga of Kiev, used pigeons and sparrows to set fire to villages in the 10th century
Jean Desbouvrie
Military animals
Pigeon intelligence
Pigeon photography
Project Pigeon
Beach House Park, Worthing: Site of a memorial to war pigeons
"Corporal Punishment", an episode of Blackadder featuring a fictional World War I carrier pigeon named Speckled Jim

Notes

References

External links 

 Smithsonian page on Cher Ami, a decorated World War I pigeon
 History of the 77th
 Pigeons and WWI
 World War 2 History and the WW2 Pigeons 
 "UK Mulled Using Birds for Bio-War After WW2 - Files" Reuters (21 May 2004)

Animal intelligence
Domestic pigeons
Pigeon
Combat occupations